This is a list of Italian football transfers featuring at least one Serie A or Serie B club which were completed from 3 January 2014 to 31 January 2014, date in which the winter transfer window would close. Free agent could join any club at any time.

Transfers
Legend
Those clubs in Italic indicate that the player already left the team on loan this season or new signing that immediately left the club
Players' nationality is only shown for non-EU footballers, excluding loan deal that turned definitive and renewed loans. Serie A clubs could only signed 2 non-EU players from abroad by certain criteria, such as replace departed non-EU player or the club completely did not have non-EU players.

Footnotes

References
general
 
 
 

specific

Transfers
2013-14
Italian